The 1984 Intercontinental Final was the tenth running of the Intercontinental Final as part of the qualification for the 1984 Speedway World Championship. The 1984 Final was run on 20 July at the Speedway Center in Vojens, Denmark, and was the last qualifying stage for riders from Scandinavia, the USA and from the Commonwealth nations for the World Final to be held at the Ullevi stadium in Göteborg, Sweden.

1984 Intercontinental Final
20 July
 Vojens, Vojens Speedway Center
Qualification: Top 11 plus 1 reserve to the World Final in Göteborg, Sweden

References

See also
 Motorcycle Speedway

1984
World Individual
1984 in Danish motorsport